The following are people of note who were born in, live in, or have formerly resided in Fort Worth, Texas.

Sports 

 Brandon Finnegan, professional baseball pitcher for the Cincinnati Reds
 Lance Cole Barrett (born 1984 in Fort Worth), Major League Baseball umpire
 Tom Buckman (born 1947), professional football player
 Mike Renfro (NFL football player) born in Fort Worth, Texas, 1955
 Chennedy Carter (born 1998), professional basketball player for Atlanta Dream
 Raymond Clayborn (born 1955), NFL football player
 Donald Curry, former undisputed world welterweight boxing champion
 John Douglas (1945–2005), NFL player
 Jack Haden (1914–1996), American football player
 Phil Handler (1908–1968), NFL football player and coach
 Brad Hawpe (born 1979), professional baseball player
 Irv Hill (1908–1978), American football running back in the NFL for the Chicago Cardinals and Boston Redskins
 Brock Holt (born 1988), professional baseball player
Rogers Hornsby (1896–1963), Hall of Fame baseball player
Keith Langford, professional basketball player
Yale Lary (1930–2017), Football Hall of Famer
Rags Matthews (1905–1999), football player for TCU
Rod Manuel (born 1974), football player
William Paulus, swimmer and former world record holder in the 100m Butterfly
 Hunter Pence (born 1983), MLB baseball player
Jeff Newman, MLB All-Star baseball player and manager
Chuck Reynolds (born 1946), football player
Mike Richardson (born 1946), NFL player
A'Shawn Robinson (born 1995), NFL player; attended Arlington Heights High School in Fort Worth.
John Roderick (born 1944), professional football player
Johnny Rutherford (born 1938), race car driver, three-time winner of Indy 500
Denise Rutkowski (born 1961), professional bodybuilder
By Saam (1914–2000), sportscaster
Anastasia Sanders (born 2007), professional rock climber
Kelly Shoppach (born 1980), Major League Baseball catcher (2005–2013)
Slick (1957–), WWE wrestling manager
Hurley Tarver (born 1975), football player
Jeana Yeager (born 1952), broke distance records during her (and Dick Rutan's) 1986 nonstop flight around the world in an experimental Voyager
Kyle Crick Professional Baseball player for The Pittsburgh Pirates
Bryan Reynolds (born June 28, 2001) American professional soccer player who plays as a right-back for Serie A club Roma and the United States national team.

Politics and law 

 Betty Andujar (1912–1997), first Republican woman in Texas State Senate (1973–1983)
 Lawrence A. Alexander (born 1943 in Fort Worth), law professor
 Joel Burns (born 1969), politician
 Reby Cary (1920–2018), educator, historian, and member of the Texas House of Representatives
 L. Clifford Davis (born 1924), civil rights attorney and judge
 Charlie Geren (born 1949), member of Texas House of Representatives from District 99 in Tarrant County
Pete Geren (born 1952), former member of U.S. House of Representatives; former U.S. Secretary of the Army; director of Sid W. Richardson Foundation
Craig Goldman (born 1968), member of Texas House of Representatives from District 97 in Fort Worth
Kay Granger (born 1943), U.S. Representative and former mayor of Fort Worth
Debra Lehrmann, Texas Supreme Court justice, Place 3
Joe K. Longley, former President of the Texas State Bar
Lorraine Miller, first woman president of the NAACP, Interim president and CEO, March 2014
"Pappy" O'Daniel (1890–1969), Governor of Texas, U.S. Senator and radio personality
Bill Owens (born 1950), former Governor of Colorado (1999–2007)
John T. Montford (born 1943), businessman and former member of the Texas Senate
Hugh Parmer (1939–2020), mayor of Fort Worth 1977 to 1979; member of both houses of Texas State Legislature
Bennett Ratliff (born 1961), state representative from District 115 in Dallas County; civil engineer
Tom Schieffer (born 1947), U.S. Ambassador to Japan, candidate for governor
Mark M. Shelton (born 1956), pediatrician and politician
Jonathan Stickland (born 1983), state representative from Tarrant County
Bascom N. Timmons (1890–1987), journalist and political advisor
Daniel E. Walker (1927–2009), civil servant, rescued remains of flag burned in protest at 1984 Republican National Convention in Dallas
Jim Wright (1922–2015), U.S. Congressman from Texas and Speaker of the House

Film and television 
 Adrienne Ames (1907–1947), actress
 Texas Rose Bascom (1922–1993), film and television actress, National Cowgirl Hall of Fame inductee 1981
 Patricia Blair (1933–2013), actress
 Wes Brown (born 1982), actor
 Betty Buckley (born 1947), Tony Award-winning actress
 Kate Capshaw (born 1953), actress, married to Steven Spielberg
 Julio Cedillo (born 1970), actor, raised in Fort Worth
 Candy Clark (born 1947), Oscar-nominated actress
 Kenneth Copeland (born 1936), televangelist
 Shelly Duvall (born 1949), actress
 George Eads (born 1967) actor
 Richard Gilliland (1950-2021), actor best known as JD Shackleford in Designing Women
 Judy Graubart (born 1943), actress, The Electric Company
 Harriet Sansom Harris (born 1955), actress, Frasier, Desperate Housewives
Larry Hagman (1931–2012), actor, son of actress Mary Martin, played J.R. Ewing in Dallas
 Bug Hall (born 1985), actor
Martha Hyer (1924–2014), Oscar-nominated actress
Jesse Jane (born 1980), pornographic actor
Benton Jennings, actor
Candace Kita, actress and model
 Wallace Langham (born 1965), actor, The Larry Sanders Show, CSI: Crime Scene Investigation, and CSI: Vegas
David Mann (born 1966), actor, comedian and gospel singer
Tamela Mann (born 1966), actor, singer and songwriter
Lisa McRee (born 1961), television journalist
Leighton Meester (born 1986), actress
Lynn Merrick (1919–2007), actress
Dan Hewitt Owens (born 1947), actor
Fess Parker (1924–2010), actor
Bill Paxton (1955–2017), actor, starred in Titanic, Frailty, TV series Big Love; attended Arlington Heights High School in Fort Worth
 Richard Rawlings (born 1969) entrepreneur and reality television star
 Rex Reed (born 1938), film critic, actor, television host
Rod Roddy (1937–2003), television announcer on game shows, like Press Your Luck & The Price is Right
Ginger Rogers (1911–1995), actress and dancer who moved to Fort Worth at age of 9; attended Central (Paschal) High School. 
Bob Schieffer (born 1937), journalist, CBS Evening News anchor and Face the Nation host
 Michael "Bear" Taliferro (1961-2006), actor
Hunter Tylo (born 1962), actress
Lisa Whelchel (born 1963), actress, The Facts of Life
Van Williams (1934–2016), actor, The Green Hornet
 Morgan Woodward (1925-2019), actor, Dallas and Cool Hand Luke
Carlson Young (born 1990), actress, Scream

Military 

 Horace S. Carswell Jr. (1916–1944), USAAF, KIA World War II; posthumous Medal of Honor recipient; namesake of Carswell Air Force Base
 Robert David Law (September 15, 1944 – February 22, 1969), Medal of Honor recipient
Charles F. Pendleton, posthumous Medal of Honor recipient for actions in the Korea War; R. L. Paschal High School, Class of 1953.

Music 

 Jay Boy Adams  (born 1949), guitarist, singer, songwriter, and producer
 Trey Anastasio (born 1964), guitarist, singer, songwriter, and composer best known as the lead guitarist of the rock band Phish
 Gerry Beckley (born 1952), singer-songwriter, founding member of the band America 
 Leon Bridges (born 1989), soul singer and Grammy nominee
 T-Bone Burnett (born 1948), Oscar-winning songwriter, record producer, musician
 Kelly Clarkson (born 1982), Grammy winning singer, original American Idol winner, Emmy winner talk show host
 Ornette Coleman (1930–2015), jazz musician
 Van Cliburn (1934–2013), pianist
 Jeff Current, lead singer of Against All Will
 Bobby Day (1928–1990), musician
 Johnny Dowd (born 1948), musician
Manet Harrison Fowler (1895–1976), singer, music educator, painter
Kirk Franklin (born 1970), gospel singer and producer
John Denver (born Henry John Deutschendorf Jr., 1943–1997), singer-songwriter
Pat Green (born 1972), country musician
Marcus Haddock (born 1957 in Fort Worth), opera singer
Derek Hames (born 1979 in Fort Worth), record producer, singer, songwriter, and musician
Taylor Hawkins (1972–2022), drummer for Foo Fighters
Julius Hemphill (1938–1995), jazz composer and saxophone player
Ronald Shannon Jackson (1940–2013), jazz drummer
Cody Jinks, country music singer-songwriter
Samuel S. Losh (1884–1943), vocalist, composer, and music educator
Kirstin Maldonado (born 1992), singer-songwriter
Delbert McClinton (born 1940), singer-songwriter
Roger Miller (1936–1992), singer-songwriter
Gary Morris (born 1948), singer 
Prince Lasha (William Lawsha) (1929–2008), jazz saxophonist and flutist
Clay Perry (born 1990), songwriter and recording artist
Dewey Redman (1931–2006), free jazz saxophonist
Townes Van Zandt (1944–1997), country music singer-songwriter
William Walker (1931–2010), opera singer and director
Oh, Sleeper, heavy metal band
 iayze, rapper and songwriter.

Academics and writing 

 Mel Bradford (1934–1993), literary critic
 Heloise Bowles Cruse (1919–1977), syndicated columnist, Hints from Heloise
 James T. Draper, Jr. (born 1935), author, Baptist leader
Clare B. Dunkle (born 1964), author, librarian
Beth Haller, journalism professor
Patricia Highsmith (1921–1995), author of Strangers on a Train and The Talented Mr Ripley
Lillian B. Horace (1880-1965), author, educator, librarian
Dan Jenkins (1929–2019), sports journalist and author
Sally Jenkins (born 1960), sports journalist and author
Mary Daggett Lake (1880–1955), historian, botanist, and educator
Robert L. Lynn (1931–2020), journalist, poet, and retired college president
Blanche McVeigh (1895–1970), printmaker and art educator
Ben H. Procter (1927–2012), historian
Hazel Harvey Peace (1907–2008) educator, activist, and humanitarian
Rex Reed (born 1938), film critic
Lenora Rolla (1904–2001), activist, educator, and historian
Jennie Scott Scheuber (1860–1944), public library pioneer and Fort Worth's first librarian
Liz Smith (1923–2017), journalist, syndicated columnist
Blake R. Van Leer (1897-1956), colonel, civil rights icon, and president of Georgia Institute of Technology

Science 

 Alan Bean (1932–2018), artist, retired NASA astronaut (1981); R. L. Paschal High School, Class of 1950; carried Paschal High School's flag to the Moon.
 Robert Bruce Merrifield (1921-2006), biochemist who won the Nobel Prize in Chemistry in 1984
 Clyde Snow (1928-2014), forensic anthropologist

Business and philanthropy 

 Sid Bass (born 1943), billionaire, Sundance Square developer, major stockholder in The Walt Disney Company
 Amon G. Carter (1879–1955), civic booster, philanthropist, creator and publisher of Fort Worth Star-Telegram
 Electra Carlin (1912–2000), art dealer
 T. Cullen Davis (born 1933), millionaire tried and acquitted for 1976 murders of Stan Farr and Andrea Wilborn
 Edna Gladney (1886–1961), founder of Edna Gladney Home
 Brad Hunstable (born 1978), founder of Ustream
 Hazel Vaughn Leigh (1897–1995), founder of the Fort Worth Boys Club
 Bill Noël (1914–1987), oil industrialist and philanthropist from Odessa, born in Fort Worth
 Sid W. Richardson (1891–1959), oilman, cattleman and philanthropist
 Lucille Elizabeth Bishop Smith (1892-1985), entrepreneur, chef, and inventor 
 A. Latham Staples (born 1977), CEO of EXUSMED, civil rights activist and founder of Empowering Spirits Foundation

Other 
Gretchen Polhemus, Miss Texas USA 1989 and Miss USA 1989
Cattle Annie (1882–1978), female bandit, lived in Fort Worth 1910 to 1912 
Mark David Chapman (born 1955), killer of John Lennon
Brown Harwood (1891–1963), realtor and leader in the Ku Klux Klan
Opal Lee, activist promoting the Juneteenth federal holiday
G. Craige Lewis (born 1969), Christian minister
Lee Harvey Oswald (1939–1963), accused assassin of President John F. Kennedy
Skratch (born 1972), pinstripe artist and fabricator
Randy Souders (born 1954), visual artist and disability rights advocate
Soapy Smith (1860–1898), infamous con man who started his career in Fort Worth

References

Fort Worth
Fort Worth